Florida's Tribute to the Women of the Confederacy, also known as A Tribute to the Women of the Southern Confederacy and the Monument to the Women of the Confederacy, is an outdoor Confederate memorial installed in Jacksonville, Florida's Springfield Park.  A plaque says the memorial honors women of the Confederate states who "sacrificed their all upon their country's altar" during the Confederacy's 1861-65 war to secede from the United States. 

The memorial was erected during the peak of Confederate monument-building, part of widespread campaigns to promote and justify Jim Crow laws in the South.

Description and history
In 1912, the Florida division of the United Confederate Veterans voted to ask each Confederate veteran to contribute $5 to fund a monument to the Confederacy's women, "who were the heroines of that struggle". 

The monument was designed in 1914 by sculptor Allen George Newman (1875–1940), and dedicated on October 26, 1915. The memorial's bronze sculptures were cast by Jno. Williams, Inc. and McNeel Marble Works served as the work's contractor. 

Such early-20th-century Confederate memorials were "part and parcel of the initiation of legally mandated segregation and widespread disenfranchisement across the South", the American Historical Association (AHA) wrote in 2017. They  "were intended, in part, to obscure the terrorism required to overthrow Reconstruction, and to intimidate African Americans politically and isolate them from the mainstream of public life." 

In 1992, the memorial's condition was deemed "treatment needed" by the Smithsonian Institution's "Save Outdoor Sculpture!" program.

Removal efforts
In May 2018, the monument was cited among those targeted by the March for Change, a three-day, 40-mile (64-km) protest against Confederate monuments in Jacksonville and St. Augustine, Florida. It is No. 10 on the Make It Right Project's list of Confederate memorials it wants to see removed.

In 2021, Jacksonville Mayor Lenny Curry requested $1.3 million to dismantle the memorial, but the city council blocked the request. In 2022, the council adopted a one-year plan to host "community conversations" by mid-year; as of December, no such meetings had been held.

See also
 1915 in art
 List of Confederate monuments and memorials
 Removal of Confederate monuments and memorials

References

External links
 

1915 establishments in Florida
1915 sculptures
Buildings and structures in Jacksonville, Florida
Confederate States of America monuments and memorials in Florida
Monuments and memorials to women
Outdoor sculptures in Florida
Statues in Florida
United Confederate Veterans
Women in Florida